Brainbench was an online education company founded in January 1998 (until 8 December 1999 the name was Tekmetrics.com) and later acquired by PreVisor in 2006. PreVisor merged with SHL in 2011; SHL was acquired by the Corporate Executive Board in 2012. CEB was acquired by Gartner in 2017. CEB's Talent Assessment business was acquired from Gartner by Exponent Private Equity in 2018. The CEB Talent Assessment Business was re-branded as SHL in 2018. Brainbench provided online certifications mainly in the Information Technology field and others in general. The company had provided its services to over 5,000 corporate clients and over 6 million individuals. Some of Brainbench's 630 exams are available free of charge, while others are administered for a fee.

Testing
Brainbench provided online tests for registered users on its website. The tests included paid tests, which required payment in order to take the exams, free tests, and beta tests, which are pre-released tests where no certificates are provided when testing is completed.  Brainbench ended their services on August 31, 2022.

References

Further reading
 The Washington Times 
 Start Your Own E-Learning Business. Entrepreneur Press.
 InfoWorld
 New Straits Times

External links
 

Defunct American websites
Internet properties established in 1998
American educational websites